The Chamberlain Memorial, also known as the Chamberlain Memorial Fountain, is a monument in Chamberlain Square, Birmingham, England, erected in 1880 to commemorate the public service of Joseph Chamberlain (1836–1914), Birmingham businessman, councillor, mayor, Member of Parliament, and statesman. An inauguration ceremony was held on 20 October 1880, when Chamberlain himself was present.

Construction
For the creation of the monument, £3,000 of public funds were raised. It was designed by the architect John Henry Chamberlain – no relation of the statesman, but a personal friend and himself a member of the Liberal elite who dominated civic life in Birmingham at this time. It bears a  portrait medallion of Chamberlain by Thomas Woolner on the south side. The carvings of the capitals and the crocketted spire were done by Samuel Barfield of Leicester, John Henry Chamberlain's favourite sculptor. Salviati Burke and Co. of Venice were commissioned to do the mosaics after their success with the Birmingham Council House. It is Grade II listed.

Completion

The plaque on the monument reads:

Like the Chamberlain Memorial, the Chamberlain Clock (1903) in the centre of the Jewellery Quarter was also erected during Chamberlain's lifetime.

In the late 1960s, the pools around the fountain were removed, but in 1978, to celebrate their Diamond Jubilee, The Birmingham Civic Society designed and paid for the pools to be reinstated. The Portland stone spire underwent a major clean in 1994.

Reception
Many sculptors and architects took to the memorial with dissatisfaction. John Roddis, a local sculptor, described it as "an architectural scarecrow" and "a hash of ornamental details". Nikolaus Pevsner also commented on the memorial in 1966 as an "ungainly combination of shapes".

References

Further reading

External links

Monuments and memorials in Birmingham, West Midlands
Grade II listed buildings in Birmingham
Memorials to Joseph Chamberlain